The Surjit Hockey Society is an Indian society established in 1984 after Olympian Sardar Surjit Singh Randhawa. Since its establishment the society has organized the Surjit Memorial Hockey Tournament in Jalandhar every year. The society has the current Chief Minister of Punjab as its Chief Patron. Every year a hockey camp is held in an effort to find talented hockey players from the surrounding areas of Punjab. In 2012, in an effort to revive the sport in the state, Government of Punjab announced its decision to support the society.

Management
 President - Ghanshayam Thory, IAS, Deputy Commissioner, Jalandhar
Working President : Pargat Singh 
 Senior Vice Presidents - Sarojini Sharda, Viney Bublani, G. S. Khaira, Amril Sinmgh Powar and Lakhwinder Pal Singh Khaira
 Secretary General - Iqbal Singh Sandhu, PCS (Retd) 
 Chief Public Relations Officer of Society - Surinder Singh Bhapa

List of presidents

References

External links
 Official website

Sports organisations of India
Field hockey in Punjab, India
Sport in Jalandhar
Sports organizations established in 1984
Organisations based in Punjab, India
1984 establishments in Punjab, India